Deportivo Español was an Ecuadorian football club based in Guayaquil. It played two consecutive seasons in the Serie A in 1966 and 1967. It dissolved in 1970.

References

Defunct football clubs in Ecuador
Association football clubs established in 1929
Association football clubs disestablished in 1968
1929 establishments in Ecuador
1968 disestablishments in Ecuador